Paruzzaro is a comune (municipality) in the Province of Novara in the Italian region of Piedmont, located about  northeast of Turin and about  north of Novara.

Paruzzaro borders the following municipalities: Arona, Gattico-Veruno, Invorio, and Oleggio Castello. The municipal territory is home to the Romanesque church of San Marcello (late 10th-early 11th centuries). There is a fresco cycle by 15th–16th-century local artists in the church.

References

Cities and towns in Piedmont